The Hughes 36 is a Canadian sailboat that was designed by William H. Tripp Jr. and first built in 1971.

The Hughes 36 is a development of the Columbia 34 Mark II hull design, being built using tooling and moulds acquired from Columbia Yachts. It is related to the Coronado 35 design. The design was developed into the Hughes-Columbia 36 in 1979.

Production
The design was built by Hughes Boat Works in Canada, but it is now out of production.

Design
The Hughes 36 is a recreational keelboat, built predominantly of fibreglass, with wood trim. It has a masthead sloop rig or optional ketch rig, a centre-cockpit, a spooned raked stem, a raised transom, a skeg-mounted spade-type/transom-hung rudder controlled by a wheel and a fixed fin keel. It displaces  and carries  of ballast.

See also
List of sailing boat types

Related development
Columbia 34 Mark II
Coronado 35
Hughes-Columbia 36

Similar sailboats
C&C 34/36
C&C 35
C&C 36R
Cal 35
Cal 35 Cruise
Express 35
Freedom 35
Goderich 35
Island Packet 35
Hunter 35 Legend
Hunter 35.5 Legend
Hunter 356
Landfall 35
Mirage 35
Niagara 35
Pilot 35
Southern Cross 35

References

Keelboats
1970s sailboat type designs
Sailing yachts
Sailboat type designs by William H. Tripp Jr.
Sailboat types built by Hughes Boat Works